The Province of Tarlac held its local elections on Monday, May 13, 2019, as a part of the 2019 Philippine general election.  Voters selected candidates for all local positions: a town mayor, vice mayor and town councilors, as well as members of the Sangguniang Panlalawigan, the vice-governor, governor and representatives for the three districts of Tarlac. In the gubernatorial race, Tarlac's incumbent Governor Susan Yap ran unopposed for Governor while incumbent Vice-Governor Carlito David defeated former Vice-Governor Pearl Pacada in a rematch of the 2016 elections.

Provincial elections
The candidates for governor and vice governor with the highest number of votes wins the seat; they are voted separately, therefore, they may be of different parties when elected.

Gubernatorial election
Parties are as stated in their certificate of candidacies. Incumbent governor Susan Yap ran unopposed.

Results by city/municipality

Vice-gubernatorial election

Results by city/municipality

Congressional elections
Each of Tarlac's three legislative districts will elect each representative to the House of Representatives. The candidate with the highest number of votes wins the seat.

1st District
Municipalities: Anao, Camiling, Mayantoc, Moncada, Paniqui, Pura, Ramos, San Clemente, San Manuel, Santa Ignacia
Incumbent Representative Charlie Cojuangco is running unopposed.

2nd District
City: Tarlac City
Municipalities: Gerona, Victoria, San Jose
Parties are as stated in their certificate of candidacies. Victor Yap is the incumbent.

3rd District
Municipalities: Bamban, Capas, Concepcion, La Paz
Noel Villanueva is the incumbent.

Provincial Board elections
All three Districts of Tarlac elected Sangguniang Panlalawigan, or provincial board members.  Election is via plurality-at-large voting. The total votes are the actual number of voters who voted, not the total votes of all candidates

1st District

Municipalities: Anao, Camiling, Mayantoc, Moncada, Paniqui, Pura, Ramos, San Clemente, San Manuel, Santa Ignacia

|-
|colspan=5 bgcolor=black|

2nd District

City: Tarlac City
Municipalities: Gerona, Victoria, San Jose

|-
|colspan=5 bgcolor=black|

3rd District
Municipalities: Bamban, Capas, Concepcion, La Paz

|-
|colspan=5 bgcolor=black|

References

External links
Commission on Elections

Elections in Tarlac
2019 Philippine local elections
May 2019 events in the Philippines
2019 elections in Central Luzon